Tanner is a place in Washington County, Georgia, United States.

Populated places in Washington County, Georgia